Predrag Bošnjak (born 13 November 1985) is a Hungarian footballer who plays for Szombathelyi Haladás.

Career
Born as a Serb in Subotica, SR Serbia, SFR Yugoslavia, he played with several Serbian lower league clubs before moving to Hungary in 2010.

In 2014, he made his debut for the Hungarian national team.

References

External links
MLSZ 
HLSZ 

1985 births
Living people
Sportspeople from Subotica
Hungarian people of Serbian descent
Serbian footballers
Hungarian footballers
Hungary international footballers
Association football defenders
FK Bačka 1901 players
FK Veternik players
RFK Novi Sad 1921 players
OFK Kikinda players
FK Proleter Novi Sad players
Nyíregyháza Spartacus FC players
Veszprém LC footballers
Szombathelyi Haladás footballers
Nemzeti Bajnokság I players